Govan High School is a secondary school situated in Govan, Glasgow, Scotland. It opened on its current site in 1969 and in 2010 it celebrated its centenary, with Sir Alex Ferguson (a former pupil) attending the event.

Notable alumni

Sir Alex Ferguson (attended 1954–1958) – professional footballer and manager of Manchester United from 1986 to 2013.

References

External links
School website
Govan High School's page on Parentzone

Secondary schools in Glasgow
Govan
Educational institutions with year of establishment missing